Lomela is a city in Kasaï-Oriental province of the Democratic Republic of the Congo. As of 2012, it had an estimated population of 10,883.

References 

Populated places in Kasaï-Oriental